A spacecraft prefix is a combination of letters, usually abbreviations, used in front of the name of a spacecraft, and its purpose is often analogous to more conventional ship prefixes. This list does not include prefixes used on rockets, rocket launches, and spaceflights. Non-productive prefixes (e.g. CSS in CSS Skywalker) are also not included in the list.

Prefixes

Notes

References 

Space lists
Initialisms